Arno Wallaard Memorial is a single-day bicycle road race held annually in the Dutch region of Alblasserwaard: prior to 2007, the race was called "Omloop Alblasserwaard". Since 2009, it is organized as a 1.2 event on the UCI Europe Tour.

Winners

External links
  

UCI Europe Tour races
Cycle races in the Netherlands
Recurring sporting events established in 1985
1985 establishments in the Netherlands
Cycling in South Holland
Alblasserwaard